Oluwole Olayiwola Amusan is a Nigerian academic and incumbent Vice Chancellor of Adeleke University, a private university owned by Chief Adedeji Adeleke, the father of Davido, an award-winning Nigerian musician.

References

Living people
Year of birth missing (living people)